"Soy" is the 25th album and 20th studio album recorded by Puerto Rican singer Ednita Nazario, it was released on October 27, 2009. As a rock musician, Ednita never ceases to amaze with their musical selections. And this time is joined by some of the most important composers of the industry, including Rafael Esparza, Tommy Thompson, Claudia Brant, Samo (rock pop group Camila), and Mark Portman.

The Puerto Rican and also a close friend of Ednita, Tommy Torres is also one of the producers who account this new album, scheduled to release October 27, 2009. Two other producers who collaborate with Ednita to make this project a flawless are Sebastian Krys and Graeme Pleeth.

Track listing

Charts
The album debuted at #1 on Billboard Top Latin Albums, becoming her third album to debut at that position. Also, the album notched the highest first-week sales for a female Latin act so far this year, surpassing Nelly Furtado's first-week sales for Mi Plan. The album so far has spent two weeks on top of the Billboard charts.

Awards

2010 Billboard Latin Music Awards

References

2009 albums
Ednita Nazario albums
Albums produced by Sebastian Krys